Jim Murphy (born 14 October 1956) is a Scottish professional footballer, who played in the Scottish Football League for Queen of the South, Dundee, Hamilton Academical, Ayr United  and Clyde.

External links

1956 births
Living people
Footballers from Hamilton, South Lanarkshire
Scottish footballers
Association football wingers
Celtic F.C. players
Queen of the South F.C. players
Bellshill Athletic F.C. players
Dundee F.C. players
Hamilton Academical F.C. players
Ayr United F.C. players
Clyde F.C. players
Scottish Football League players
Scottish Junior Football Association players